Avlida or Aulis a former municipality in Euboea regional unit, Greece. Since the 2011 local government reform it is part of the municipality Chalcis, of which it is a municipal unit. The population was 9,300 inhabitants at the 2011 census, and the land area is 122.235 km². The seat of the municipality was in Vathy. Although part of the Euboea regional unit, it is not located on the island Euboea, but on the mainland, attached to the northeastern part of Boeotia.

Traditionally it is identified with the ancient Aulis, the port from which the Greek army set sail for the Trojan War and the setting for the Euripides play, Iphigenia in Aulis.

External links
Official website

References

Populated places in Euboea (regional unit)